Philippa Ngaju Makobore is a Ugandan electrical engineer. She is the head of the instrumentation division at the Uganda Industrial Research Institute (UIRI).

Early life and education
Makobore studied at Gayaza High School but graduated from a high school in Canada. In 2008, she earned a Bachelor of Science in electrical engineering from the University of Alberta Faculty of Engineering in Edmonton, Canada. She also earned a professional certificate in embedded systems engineering from the University of California, Irvine, United States.

Career
From 2009 until 2010, Makobore served as an intern telecommunications engineer at MTN Group. She then worked as a sales engineer.

In early 2011, she joined UIRI and later became the head of its instrumentation division. The division is regularly invited to give oral presentations at medical engineering conferences, including the Canadian Medical and Biological Engineering Conference, the World Congress for Biomedical Engineering and Medical Physics, and the Institute of Electrical and Electronics Engineers. She once was a session chair for the medical devices track at the World Congress. At UIRI, Makobore focuses on the design and development of electronic applications. Her team works on health care, agriculture, and energy projects. Some of these projects have won local and international awards. At UIRI, she has also built partnerships with Columbia University in New York City, Makerere University in Kampala, Addis Ababa University, and the Mbarara University of Science and Technology.

In 2017, Makobore entered the Innovation Prize for Africa with the electronically controlled gravity feed infusion set (ECGF). The ECGF won the second prize (US$25,000). In east Africa, more than 10 percent of children admitted to hospital need IV therapy. Over-infusion in children increases the absolute risk of death by 3.3 percent at 48 hours. The ECGF controls the flow rate  of intravenous fluids.

Awards
 2016: First place Innovation Award at the 2016 World Patient Safety, Science, and Technology Summit
 2017: Second place Innovation Prize for Africa

See also
 Emmy Wasirwa
 Charles Ibingira

References

External links
Brief Biography of Philippa Ngaju Makobore BSc Electrical Engineering, MSE Biomedical Engineering As of 2017.

Living people
Ugandan electrical engineers
Ugandan women engineers
People from Western Region, Uganda
University of Alberta alumni
People educated at Gayaza High School
21st-century women engineers
Year of birth missing (living people)
21st-century Ugandan women scientists
21st-century Ugandan scientists